The place name Tahora may refer to:

Tahora, Manawatū-Whanganui, New Zealand
Tahora, Otago, New Zealand